Zhao Jing (born 9 July 1988 in Shanghai) is a Chinese athlete who specialises in the middle-distance events. She won the bronze medal in the 800 metres at the 2014 Asian Games. She won a middle-distance double for her province at the 12th Chinese National Games in 2013.

Competition record

Personal bests
Outdoor
800 metres – 1:59.48 (Incheon 2014)
1000 metres – 2:40.53 (Changbaishan 2014)
1500 metres – 4:10.67 (Hefei 2011)
Indoor
800 metres – 2:04.15 (Hangzhou 2012)

References

1988 births
Living people
Runners from Shanghai
Chinese female middle-distance runners
Asian Games medalists in athletics (track and field)
Athletes (track and field) at the 2014 Asian Games
World Athletics Championships athletes for China
Asian Games bronze medalists for China
Medalists at the 2014 Asian Games
Competitors at the 2011 Summer Universiade